Agricultural Cooperative University is a private university located in Goyang City, Gyeonggi province, South Korea.  It is operated by the National Agricultural Cooperative Federation, also known as Nonghyup (농협).

History 

The school was first founded under the aegis of  Konkuk University in 1962. Nonghyup took over the operation in 1966.

Students

The student body is roughly 300.  The school's alumni today number more than 3,400, most of whom are employed by the National Agricultural Cooperative Federation.

See also
Education in South Korea
List of colleges and universities in South Korea

External links 
 Official school website, in Korean
 PDF file including English-language school profile

Vocational education in South Korea
Universities and colleges in Gyeonggi Province
Goyang